In France, an urban unit (fr: "unité urbaine") is a statistical area defined by INSEE, the French national statistics office, for the measurement of contiguously built-up areas. According to the INSEE definition , an "unité urbaine" is a commune alone or a grouping of communes which: a) form a single unbroken spread of urban development, with no distance between habitations greater than 200 m and b) have all together a population greater than 2,000 inhabitants. Communes not belonging to an unité urbaine are considered rural.

The French unité urbaine is a statistical area in accordance with United Nations recommendations for the measurement of contiguously built-up areas. Other comparable units in other countries are the United States "Urbanized Area" and the "urban area" definition shared by Canada and the United Kingdom. The French aire d'attraction d'une ville is equivalent to the functional urban area as defined by Eurostat, and represents a population and employment centre (urban cluster) and its commuting zone. The zoning into unités urbaines and aires d'attraction des villes was last revised in 2020.

French urban units with over 200,000 inhabitants 
This list shows the unités urbaines as of the 2020 revision.

See also
 Functional area (France)
 List of communes in France with over 20,000 inhabitants
 Urban area (France)

References

Urban planning in France
Human habitats
Urban areas
INSEE concepts